{{Speciesbox
| image = Avicennia officinalis Blanco1.73-cropped.jpg
| image_caption = Indian mangrove
| status = LC
| status_system = IUCN3.1
| status_ref = 
| genus = Avicennia
| species = officinalis
| authority = L.
|synonyms = 
 Avicennia obovata Griff.
 Avicennia oepata Buch.-Ham.
 Avicennia officinalis var. acuminata Domin
 Avicennia officinalis f. flaviflora Kuntze
 Avicennia officinalis f. tomentosa Kuntze
 Halodendrum thouarsii Roem. & Schult.
 Racka ovata Roem. & Schult.
 Racka torrida J.F.Gmel.
|synonyms_ref = <ref name = powo>Avicennia officinalis L. Plants of the World Online, Kew Science. Accessed 19 March 2023</ref>
}}Avicennia officinalis is a species of mangrove also known as Indian mangrove. The genus Avicennia is named after the famous Persian scientist Ibn Sina. 

Description

The young tree forms a low, dense bushy crown. When it matures, it forms a columnar tree up to 15 m and may grow up to 30 m. The shiny green leaves, 10 cm long by 5 cm wide, have rounded apexes and golden-brown under leaf and grow in opposites. The flower, the largest among the Avicennia species has a diameter of 6 to 10 mm when expanded. It is orange yellow to lemon yellow in color. The bark is smooth, dirty green to dark gray in color. It is slightly fissured and does not flake. The fruit is green or brown, heart-shaped abruptly narrowed to a short beak,  is 2.5 cm long or more.

Range and habitatAvicennia officinalis ranges from the eastern Indian Ocean to the western Pacific, along the shores of India, Sri Lanka, Bangladesh, Myanmar, Thailand, Cambodia, Vietnam, Indonesia, Malaysia, Brunei, Timor Leste, New Guinea, and northern and eastern Australia (Northern Territory, Queensland, and New South Wales).Avicennia officinalis is found sporadically on the banks of rivers and rarely found near the sea. It prefers clay soil and usually found inland. 

Uses
The 1889 book The Useful Native Plants of Australia records "mangrove egaie of the Cleveland Bay aboriginals; tagontagon of the Rockhampton aboriginals, baa-lunn, and ttchoonche are other aboriginal names. The fruit is heart-shaped, with two thick cotyledons. The aboriginals of Cleveland Bay dig a hole in the ground, where they light a good fire; when well ignited, they throw stones over it, which when sufficiently heated, they arrange horizontally at the bottom, and lay on the top the egaie fruit, sprinkling a little water over it; they cover it with bark, and over the whole, earth is placed to prevent the steam from evaporating too freely. During the time required for baking (about two hours), they dig another hole in the sand ; the softened egaie is put into it, they pour water twice over it, and the midamio'' is now fit for eating. They resort to that sort of food during the wet season when precluded
from searching for any other." (Murrell's testimony,* quoted by Mens. Thozet.) In Salt-water estuaries all round the coast. * Murrell was a shipwrecked sailor, who lived for 17 years with the aboriginals
of Cleveland Bay, Queensland.".

Taxonomy references

References

External links

officinalis
Mangroves
Flora of tropical Asia
Central Indo-Pacific flora
Flora of Australia
Plants described in 1753
Taxa named by Carl Linnaeus